Salamis may refer to :

Places and battles 
 Salamis Island in the Saronic Gulf of the Aegean Sea, near Athens, Greece
 Salamina (city), former municipality on Salamis Island
 Salamis Naval Base, a Greek naval base on Salamis Island
 Battle of Salamis, 480 BC, between allied Greeks and Achaemenid Persian empire
 Salamis, Cyprus or Constantia, an ancient city in Cyprus
 Battle of Salamis in Cyprus (450 BC), between Greeks and Persians
 Battle of Salamis (306 BC), between Ptolemy I and Demetrius
 Salamis (ruin), site in Northern Israel that had formerly been a fortress

Other uses 
 Greek battleship Salamis, a dreadnought ordered in 1912
 Salamis (mythology), a nymph in Greek mythology
 Salamis (butterfly), a genus in the family Nymphalidae
 Salamis (novel), a 2020 book by Harry Turtledove
 Salamis Tablet, a counting board (300 BC) discovered on Salamis Island

See also 
 Salami, a type of cured sausage
 Salamina (disambiguation)